Jordan Loveridge (born November 26, 1993) is an American basketball player for Astros de Jalisco of the Liga Nacional de Baloncesto Profesional (LNBP). He played college basketball for the Utah Utes.

High school career
Loveridge attended West Jordan High School where he was coached by Scott Briggs. He appeared in several games as a freshman and averaged 13.0 points per game as a sophomore. As a junior, Loveridge posted 23.5 points per game. He led West Jordan to the state finals but was told by  Utah head coach Jim Boylen he was not good enough to play for them. Loveridge was named Utah Mr. Basketball in 2012. As a senior, he led the Jaguars to a 21-3 record by averaging 22.9 points and 13.1 rebounds per game. Loveridge committed to Utah in September 2011 after new coach Larry Krystkowiak recruited him.

College career
Loveridge had an instant impact as a freshman, averaging 12 points and seven rebounds per game, but was left off the All-Pac-12 All-Freshman Team. He earned Utah's first-ever Pac-12 player of the week nod on December 8, 2013, after a 27-point, seven rebound performance against  Idaho State and 21 points and five assists in the 81-64 win over rival BYU. As a sophomore, he averaged 14.7 points per game.

In December 2014, it was announced that Loveridge would miss significant time due to recovery from knee surgery. His scoring production fell to 10 points per game as a junior, but the team made the Sweet 16 of the NCAA Tournament. He averaged 11.6 points and 3.8 rebounds per game as a senior at Utah. Loveridge finished his college career with 1,568 points, the 13th highest mark in Utah history.

Professional career
Loveridge worked out with a few NBA teams, including the Utah Jazz. In August 2016 he signed with BC Körmend of the Hungarian league. "In a different time of system, I'll be able to show I can do more things," he said. He averaged 10.5 points, 4.9 rebounds, 1.9 assists and 1.1 steals per game for Kormend. After the season Loveridge inked with BBC Lausanne of the Swiss League. Loveridge joined the German club BG Göttingen in 2017. He signed with  Krosno of the Polish Basketball League on August 3, 2018. In September 2019, Loveridge signed with Swans Gmunden of the Austrian Basketball Superliga. He averaged 17.8 points and seven rebounds per game. On June 25, 2020, Loveridge signed with Kobrat in the Finnish league.

Loveridge helped Mexican team Astros de Jalisco win the 2022 CIBACOPA title and was named league MVP. He was also named the All-Star Game MVP after recording 47 points. Later that year, Loveridge was named a Liga Nacional de Baloncesto Profesional (LNBP) All-Star, with the team playing in both leagues. He returned to the Astros for the 2023 season.

References

External links
Utah Utes bio

1993 births
Living people
American expatriate basketball people in Austria
American expatriate basketball people in Finland
American expatriate basketball people in Germany
American expatriate basketball people in Hungary
American expatriate basketball people in Mexico
American expatriate basketball people in Poland
American expatriate basketball people in Switzerland
American men's basketball players
Astros de Jalisco players
Basketball players from Utah
BG Göttingen players
KKK MOSiR Krosno players
Parade High School All-Americans (boys' basketball)
People from West Jordan, Utah
Small forwards
Swans Gmunden players
Kobrat players
Utah Utes men's basketball players